The Zenit 3SLB or Zenit-3M is a Ukrainian expendable carrier rocket derived from the Zenit-2SB. It is a member of the Zenit family of rockets, which were designed by the Yuzhnoye Design Office. Produced at Yuzhmash, the rocket is a modified version of the Zenit-3SL, designed to be launched from a conventional launch pad rather than the Sea Launch Ocean Odyssey platform. Most of components of the rocket are produced in Russia.

Launches of Zenit-3SLB rockets are conducted from Site 45/1 at the Baikonur Cosmodrome. Commercial launches are conducted by Land Launch, and use the designation 3SLB, whilst launches conducted by Federal Space Agency Roskosmos or the Russian Space Forces will use the designation 3M.

It consists of a Zenit 2SB (Zenit-2M) core vehicle, with a Block DM-SLB upper stage by RSC Energia (Russia). The rocket's fairing is developed by Lavochkin (Khimki, Moscow, Russia).

The launch services are provided by "Land Launch", a subsidiary of Sea Launch, and Space International Services, a Russian/Ukrainian joint venture.

The first launch of a Zenit-3SLB occurred on 28 April 2008, carrying the Israeli AMOS-3 satellite. This was also the first commercial Zenit launch from Baikonur since a failed Globalstar launch in 1998, and the first launch to be conducted by the Land Launch consortium.

Launches

References

Zenit (rocket family)
Vehicles introduced in 2008